"The Lady in Red" is a song by British-Irish singer-songwriter Chris de Burgh. It was released on 20 June 1986 as the second single from the album Into the Light. The song was responsible for introducing de Burgh's music to a mainstream audience worldwide.

Creation
The song was written in reference to his wife Diane, who used to come and watch him perform at his parents' hotel. It was released on the album Into the Light. On the British TV series This Is Your Life, de Burgh said that the song was inspired by the memory of when he first saw Diane, and how men so often cannot even remember what their wives were wearing when they first met.

Critical reception and impact
The song was a massive hit across the world, quickly becoming de Burgh's best-selling single and his signature song, transforming him from a cult artist into a household name in many countries. It reached the number one position in Canada, the United Kingdom, Ireland, Norway, and the Flanders region of Belgium. It reached number three in the United States during the spring of 1987. The song also propelled its parent album Into The Light to the number two position in the United Kingdom and success in other markets. The song was de Burgh's third UK hit single and first to reach the top 40.

The song tends to divide public opinion and it was voted the tenth most annoying song of all time in a poll commissioned by Dotmusic in 2000. It was one of only two singles in the top ten which were not novelty songs. It was also voted the third worst song of the 1980s by readers of Rolling Stone. It was chosen as the sixth worst love song of all time by Gigwise, who said "it is destined to grate on you at weddings forever more." In a 2001 poll of more than 50,000 Channel 4 viewers and readers of The Observer, the song was voted the fourth most-hated UK number-one single.   On the Channel 4 show, journalist, presenter, and author Stuart Maconie opined that the song was "one of the few things I can think of that has absolutely no redeeming feature. It's a terrible song, sung very badly, by a bloke who, you'd rather not have on your television."

Neil Norman of The Independent argued in 2006: "Only James Blunt has managed to come up with a song more irritating than Chris de Burgh's 'Lady in Red'. The 1986 mawkfest – according to De Burgh – has reduced many famous people to tears including Diana, Princess of Wales, Fergie and Mel Smith. The less emotionally impressionable, meanwhile, adopt Oscar Wilde's view on the death of Little Nell – that it would take a heart of stone to listen to 'Lady in Red' and not laugh."

Music video
The music video is a studio performance, with animation at the beginning and at the end of the song. It features a curly-haired woman in red who depicts the song's lyrics.

In popular culture
The song is briefly featured in a scene of the 2000 movie American Psycho where the main character Patrick Bateman is listening to the song while in his office.

Chart performance

Weekly charts

Year-end charts

Certifications

Alternate versions

 In 1987, de Burgh released a Spanish language adaptation of "The Lady in Red" entitled "La Dama de Ayer" (literally "the lady of yesterday") as a 7-inch single in Spain.
 In 1995, de Burgh recorded a version with a full orchestra for Beautiful Dreams, his twelfth original album.
 In 2022, de Burgh performed a solo piano version of "The Lady in Red" in Schönbrunn Palace on the ABC reality television show, The Bachelor.

See also
List of number-one singles of 1986 (Canada)
List of number-one singles of 1986 (Ireland)
List of UK Singles Chart number ones of the 1980s
VG-lista 1964 to 1994

References

External links

American Attitude – Lady In Red (Live Cover Version)

1986 songs
1986 singles
A&M Records singles
Chris de Burgh songs
Irish Singles Chart number-one singles
Number-one singles in Norway
Number-one singles in Poland
Number-one singles in South Africa
RPM Top Singles number-one singles
Songs written by Chris de Burgh
UK Singles Chart number-one singles
Ultratop 50 Singles (Flanders) number-one singles